The Cambodian striped squirrel (Tamiops rodolphii) is a species of rodent in the family Sciuridae. It is found in eastern Thailand, Cambodia, southern Laos, and southern Vietnam.

Behavior

One of the Cambodian striped squirrel's more unusual behaviors is how it forages for food by searching across the vertical bark surfaces of trees. It is relatively uncommon across the squirrel family and especially so without abducted limb adaptations.

References

Tamiops
Mammals described in 1867
Rodents of Cambodia
Rodents of Laos
Rodents of Thailand
Rodents of Vietnam
Taxonomy articles created by Polbot